Tomás Miguel Lynch (born 24 December 1947) is an Argentine former professional tennis player. He is a long serving board member of the Argentine Tennis Association and a current vice president.

Lynch was a member of the Argentina Davis Cup team in the 1970s, featuring in two ties for his country. He debuted in 1971 against Chile and played in two singles rubbers, then returned in 1975 for a tie with Uruguay. His only win came against Uruguay's Hugo Roverano.

See also
List of Argentina Davis Cup team representatives

References

External links
 
 
 

1947 births
Living people
Argentine male tennis players